Albert Hardenberg or Albertus Risaeus (c. 1510 in Rheeze near Hardenberg – 18 May 1574 in Emden) was a Reformed theologian and Protestant reformer, who was also active as a reformer in Cologne, Bremen and Emden.

Life
From the age of seven, he was put in the school of the "Fratres vitae communis" in Groninghe. He decided at the age of 17 to become a priest and became a monk in the abbey of Aduard. In 1540, he was sent by his community as a student at the University of Louvain to take theology courses so that he could one day be able to become abbot of a monastery. There he obtained his degree of license, but he was quickly drawn into the movement of active reformers in the University of Louvain.

Bibliography 
 , Vol 7, p 404
 Spiegel: , (Bremer Jahrbuch 4) Bremen, 1869.
 Jürgen Moltmann: , Bremen 1958, 16ff.
 H. Engelhardt: , (Diss.) Frankfurt, 1961.
 H. Engelhardt: , (JGNKG 61, 1963, 32ff.)
 H. Engelhardt: , (Hospitium Ecclesiae 4, 1964, 32ff.)
 W. Neuser: , (JGNKG 65, 1967, 142ff.)
 Rottländer: , Göttingen, 1982
 Wim Janse, Leiden, New York u. Köln 1994
 Wim Janse, In: Hospitum Ecclaesiae. Forschungen zur bremischen Kirchengeschichte 22, 2003, pp. 43-53
 Heinz Scheible:  Personen 12 Stuttgart-Bad Cannstatt, 2005 
 Werner Kloos: , Hauschild Verlag, Bremen, 1980,

External links 
 Biography

References

1510 births
1574 deaths
Dutch Calvinist and Reformed theologians
German Protestant Reformers
People from Hardenberg
Old University of Leuven alumni
16th-century Calvinist and Reformed theologians